Bayou Country may refer to:

 Bayou Country, a region in the Gulf Coast of the US where bayous are found
 Bayou Country (album), a 1969 album by American rock band Creedence Clearwater Revival

See also